Slavhorod is an urban-type settlement in Synelnykove Raion of Dnipropetrovsk Oblast in Ukraine. It is located on the Osokorivka, south of the town of Synelnykove. Slavhorod hosts the administration of Slavhorod settlement hromada, one of the hromadas of Ukraine. Population:

Economy

Transportation
The settlement has access to Highway M18 connecting Kharkiv with Zaporizhzhia and Melitopol.

Slavhorod-Pivdennyi railway station, in the northern part of the settlement, is on the railway connecting Synelnykove with Zaporizhzhia via Vilniansk. There is infrequent passenger traffic.

References

Urban-type settlements in Synelnykove Raion